The 1977 Masters (also known as the 1977 Colgate-Palmolive Masters) was held in Madison Square Garden, New York City, New York between January 4, and January 8,1978.  It was the year-end championship of the 1977 Colgate-Palmolive Grand Prix tour.

Finals

Singles

 Jimmy Connors defeated  Björn Borg, 6–4, 1–6, 6–4

Doubles

 Bob Hewitt /  Frew McMillan defeated  Robert Lutz /  Stan Smith 7–5, 7–6, 6–3

References

 
Grand Prix tennis circuit year-end championships
Tennis tournaments in the United States
Colgate-Palmolive Masters
1977 Colgate-Palmolive Grand Prix
Colgate-Palmolive Masters